A List of American films of 1925 is a compilation of American films that were released in the year 1925. All films on this list are in the Public Domain since 2021.

A

B

C

D

E

F

G

H

I

J

K

L

M

N

O

P

R

S

T

U-V

W

Y–Z

See also 
 1925 in the United States

References

External links 

 1925 films at the Internet Movie Database

1925
Film
Lists of 1925 films by country or language
1920s in American cinema